Siphamia is a genus of cardinalfishes native to the Indian and Pacific Ocean. Several of these species are commensal with various species of sea urchins. 

Siphamia minor, a dwarf otolith-based species from the Burdigalian (Miocene) of southwestern India is the only fossil record for this genus.

Species
The 24 recognized species in this genus are:
 Siphamia arabica Gon & G. R. Allen, 2012
 Siphamia argentea Lachner, 1953 (silver siphonfish)
 Siphamia brevilux Gon & G. R. Allen, 2012 (shortlight siphonfish)
 Siphamia cephalotes (Castelnau, 1875) (Wood's siphonfish)
 Siphamia corallicola G. R. Allen, 1993 (coral siphonfish)
 Siphamia cuneiceps Whitley, 1941 (wedgehead siphonfish)
 Siphamia cyanophthalma Gon & G. R. Allen, 2012 (blue-eye siphonfish)
 Siphamia elongata Lachner, 1953 (elongated siphonfish)
 Siphamia fistulosa (M. C. W. Weber, 1909) (Fistulose cardinalfish)
 Siphamia fraseri Gon & G. R. Allen, 2012
 Siphamia fuscolineata Lachner, 1953 (crown-of-thorns cardinalfish)
 Siphamia goreni Gon & G. R. Allen, 2012
 Siphamia guttulatus (Alleyne & W. J. Macleay, 1877) (speckled siphonfish)
 Siphamia jebbi G. R. Allen, 1993 (Jebb's siphonfish)
 Siphamia majimai Matsubara & Iwai, 1958 (striped siphonfish)
 Siphamia mossambica J. L. B. Smith, 1955 (sea urchin cardinal)
 Siphamia papuensis Gon, G. R. Allen, Erdmann & Gouws, 2014 (Papuan siphonfish) 
 Siphamia randalli Gon & G. R. Allen, 2012
 Siphamia roseigaster (E. P. Ramsay & J. D. Ogilby, 1887) (pink-breasted siphonfish) 
 Siphamia senoui Gon & G. R. Allen, 2012
 Siphamia spinicola Gon & G. R. Allen, 2012 (reef siphonfish)
 Siphamia stenotes Gon & G. R. Allen, 2012 (narrow-lined siphonfish)
 Siphamia tubifer M. C. W. Weber, 1909 (tubifer cardinalfish)
 Siphamia tubulata (M. C. W. Weber, 1909) (siphonfish)
 Siphamia minor Carolin, Bajpai, Maurya & Schwarzhans, 2022 (otolith-based fossil species)

References

Apogoninae
Marine fish genera
Taxa named by Max Carl Wilhelm Weber